Chitinimonas viridis is a Gram-negative, rod-shaped bacterium species from the genus of Chitinimonas which has been isolated from an artificial lake in Korea.

References

Further reading

External links
Type strain of Chitinimonas viridis at BacDive -  the Bacterial Diversity Metadatabase

Burkholderiaceae
Bacteria described in 2014